Ivar Brogger (born January 10, 1947) is an American actor of stage, motion pictures and television. He is known for his appearances in several TV shows like 24, NCIS, Star Trek: Voyager, Private Practice and a recurring role in Invasion. He had small roles in motion pictures like Dreamgirls, Ocean's Thirteen and Little Children.

Early life

Brogger was born in Saint Paul, Minnesota, the son of Helga ( Bjornson), a librarian, and Arne W. Brogger, an attorney. His first name is pronounced "EE-var".

Filmography

References

External links

1947 births
American male film actors
American male television actors
Living people
Male actors from Saint Paul, Minnesota